Charles D. Conover (March 21, 1881 – July 27, 1937) was a Republican politician in the U.S. state of Ohio who was Speaker of the Ohio House of Representatives 1915–1916.

Mr. Conover was born in Champaign County, Ohio. He received a public school education, and attended Ohio Northern University and Ohio Wesleyan University. He was superintendent of Kings Creek schools and was married.

Conover was elected to the Ohio House of representatives in 1912 to the 80th General Assembly, and was chosen Speaker after being elected to the 81st.

Notes

References

1881 births
1937 deaths
People from Champaign County, Ohio
Republican Party members of the Ohio House of Representatives
Speakers of the Ohio House of Representatives
Ohio Northern University alumni
Ohio Wesleyan University alumni
20th-century American politicians